Rig-e Bala (also Romanized as Rīg-e Bālā; also known as Rīg, Rek, and Kalāteh-ye Rīg) is a village in Qaleh Zari Rural District, Jolgeh-e Mazhan District, Khusf County, South Khorasan Province, Iran. At the 2006 census, its population was 7, in 4 families.

References 

Populated places in Khusf County